Terence Henry Rooney (born 11 November 1950) is a British Labour Party politician who served as the Member of Parliament (MP) for Bradford North from 1990 to 2010.

He chaired the Work and Pensions Select Committee from 2005 to 2010, and was the first member of the Church of Jesus Christ of Latter-day Saints elected to the UK Parliament. Rooney's constituency was replaced by Bradford East in boundary changes for the 2010 general election, and he was defeated in the new seat by the Liberal Democrat candidate David Ward.

Early life and career 
Rooney was born in Bradford in 1950, attending Buttershaw Comprehensive School and Bradford College, and receiving a Diploma in Higher Education at the latter.

Prior to his election as the MP for Bradford North in a by-election in November 1990, he was a welfare rights adviser at the Bierley Community Centre and a member of Bradford City Council for the University ward. He served as a councillor from 1983 to 1991, a high-profile figure known for his opposition to Militant, chairing the Labour Group from 1988 to 1991, and becoming Deputy Leader of the council from 1990 to 1991.

Member of Parliament 
In Parliament, Rooney was elected as Chair of the Work and Pensions Select Committee from 2005 to 2010. Other posts he held included:

Secretary of the Yorkshire Group of Labour MPs (1991–2001).
Chair of the Parliamentary Labour Party Work and Pensions Committee (1990–2006).
Member of the Broadcasting Committee (1991–1997).
Parliamentary Private Secretary to the Minister for the Environment, Michael Meacher (1997–2001).
Parliamentary Private Secretary to the Minister for Housing and Planning, Keith Hill (2003–05).
Member of the Joint Committee on House of Lords Reform (2003–05).
Member of the Liaison Committee (2005–10).

Political interests 
Rooney's main political interests are the welfare state, public sector housing, poverty and industrial relations. He is an active trade unionist and a member of UNISON and formerly Amicus, for which he was the chair of the Amicus Parliamentary Group. Rooney is a firm supporter of the retention of first-past-the-post for Westminster elections, and has also supported more directly redistributive tax and spend policies.

Personal life 
Rooney is married to Susanne, a former Bradford councillor, with whom he has three children and nine grandchildren.

He is an active member of the Church of Jesus Christ of Latter-day Saints, and became the first, and only, member of the church elected to the UK Parliament during his tenure.

References

External links 
 
ePolitix – Terry Rooney official site
Guardian Unlimited Politics – Ask Aristotle: Terry Rooney MP
TheyWorkForYou.com – Terry Rooney MP
The Public Whip – Terry Rooney MP voting record
BBC profile

 

1950 births
Living people
English Latter Day Saints
Politicians from Bradford
Graphical, Paper and Media Union-sponsored MPs
Labour Party (UK) MPs for English constituencies
UK MPs 1987–1992
UK MPs 1992–1997
UK MPs 1997–2001
UK MPs 2001–2005
UK MPs 2005–2010